Carneades superba is a species of beetle in the family Cerambycidae. It was described by Bates in 1869. It is known from Costa Rica, Honduras, Panama and Nicaragua.

References

Colobotheini
Beetles described in 1869